Venkatreddy Mudnal is an Indian Politician, who is the current MLA of the Yadgir constituency of the Karnataka Legislative Assembly. He is the son of Freedom Fighter and Former Animal Husbandry Minister Vishwanath Reddy Mudnal who was also MLA from the same constituency.

Constituency 
He represents Yadgir (Vidhana Sabha constituency) of the Karnataka Legislative Assembly.

Political career 
Venkatreddy Mudnal is a Member of the Bharatiya Janata Party (BJP), a political party.

Positions Held 

 President of Town Municipal Council - Yadgir.
 Member of Karnataka Legislative Assembly - 2018.

References 

Karnataka MLAs 2018–2023
Indian politicians
Living people
1954 births
Politicians from Yadgir district
People from Yadgir district
Bharatiya Janata Party politicians from Karnataka